Ulric I, also Odalric or Udalrich (died 6 March 1070), Count of Weimar-Orlamünde, was margrave of Carniola from 1045 and of Istria from 1060 to his death.

Life
Ulric was the son of Margrave Poppo I of Carniola, whom he succeeded upon his death before 1044, and Hadamut, daughter of Count Werigand of Friuli and Istria.

Ulric married Sophia, the daughter of King Béla I of Hungary and his first wife, Richeza, sister of the Polish duke Casimir I the Restorer. Alternatively, it has been suggested that she was the daughter of Béla and his second wife, Tuta of Formbach, and thereby a sister of King Ladislaus I of Hungary. Another alternative hypothesis makes her the daughter of Tuta and King Peter of Hungary, but that seems highly unlikely. Sophia had been betrothed to Margrave William of Meissen, but upon his early death in 1062 married his nephew Ulric instead. She gave her first husband four children:
Poppo II (d. 1098), his successor as Margrave of Carniola, Margrave of Istria from 1096, married Richgard, daughter of Count Engelbert of Sponheim
Ulric II (d. 1112), his brother's successor, married Adelaide, daughter of Landgrave Louis the Springer of Thuringia
Richgard, married Count Eckhard I of Scheyern or his brother Count Otto II
Adelaide, married firstly Frederick, Vogt of Regensburg, and secondly Udalschalk, Count in the Lurngau

Again on 5 March 1067, Henry donated land  ('in the country of Istria in the march of Margrave Ulric'), this time to the church in Freising. A loyal supporter of the Imperial Salian dynasty and backed by his Hungarian brothers-in-law, Ulric was able to enlarge his margraviate down to Fiume, against the resistance of the Patriarchs of Aquileia and the Republic of Venice.

References
Medieval Lands Project: Nobility of Northern Italy (900–1100).

1070 deaths
Margraves of Istria
Margraves of Carniola
Year of birth unknown
11th-century military history of Croatia